Gordon Ross Hynes (born July 22, 1966) is a Canadian former professional ice hockey defenceman who played two seasons in the National Hockey League (NHL) with the Boston Bruins and Philadelphia Flyers.  Hynes was a member of the Canadian 1992 Winter Olympics ice hockey team, winning a silver medal.

Career statistics

Regular season and playoffs

International

External links
 

1966 births
Adler Mannheim players
Berlin Capitals players
Boston Bruins draft picks
Boston Bruins players
Canadian ice hockey defencemen
Cincinnati Cyclones (IHL) players
Detroit Vipers players
HC Varese players
Hershey Bears players
Ice hockey players at the 1992 Winter Olympics
Living people
Maine Mariners players
Medalists at the 1992 Winter Olympics
Medicine Hat Tigers players
Moncton Golden Flames players
Olympic ice hockey players of Canada
Olympic medalists in ice hockey
Olympic silver medalists for Canada
Philadelphia Flyers players
Schwenninger Wild Wings players
Ice hockey people from Montreal
Canadian expatriate ice hockey players in Italy
Canadian expatriate ice hockey players in Germany